New Japan Pro-Wrestling (NJPW) is a professional wrestling promotion based in Nakano, Tokyo. Title reigns are either determined by professional wrestling matches or are awarded to a wrestler, as a result of the culmination of various scripted storylines. There are 12 total active championships promoted by NJPW - featuring seven active singles championships, three traditional tag team championships, and a six-man tag team championship for male wrestlers, with one singles championship for female wrestlers. 17 wrestlers currently hold the titles. The list includes the number of times the wrestler has held the title, the date and location of the win, and a description of the winning bout.

Overview
At the top of NJPW's championship hierarchy for male wrestlers is the IWGP World Heavyweight Championship. Secondary titles include the IWGP United States Championship, the NEVER Openweight Championship, the NJPW World Television Championship, and the KOPW (King of Pro Wrestling) Championship. 

For tag teams, there is a traditional championship for two-man teams (the IWGP Tag Team Championship), and one for three-man teams (the NEVER Openweight 6-Man Tag Team Championship).

There are two championships in NJPW for junior heavyweight wrestlers - a singles title (the IWGP Junior Heavyweight Championship) and one for tag teams (the IWGP Junior Heavyweight Tag Team Championship).

In New Japan's United States based NJPW Strong brand, there are two championships  - the Strong Openweight Championship for singles wrestlers, and the Strong Openweight Tag Team Championship for tag teams.

There is one championship for female wrestlers in NJPW, which is the IWGP Women's Championship.

Current champions

Men's division
Singles

Tag Teams

Women's division

References

External links

 
Professional wrestling champion lists